Gudbrand Guldbrandsen Skatteboe (18 July 1875 – 3 April 1965) was a Norwegian rifle shooter who competed in the early 20th century in rifle shooting. He won the gold medal with the Norwegian 300 metre free rifle team at the 1908 Summer Olympics in London, also winning silver medals with the team at the 1912 and 1920 Summer Olympics. He also competed at the 1906 Intercalated Games winning a silver medal.

References

1875 births
1965 deaths
Norwegian male sport shooters
Olympic gold medalists for Norway
Olympic silver medalists for Norway
Olympic shooters of Norway
Shooters at the 1906 Intercalated Games
Shooters at the 1908 Summer Olympics
Shooters at the 1912 Summer Olympics
Shooters at the 1920 Summer Olympics
Olympic medalists in shooting
Medalists at the 1906 Intercalated Games
Medalists at the 1908 Summer Olympics
Medalists at the 1912 Summer Olympics
Medalists at the 1920 Summer Olympics